East Grinstead Cricket Club is a cricket club based in East Grinstead, in Sussex, England.  The club was founded in 1857 and won its first Sussex Cricket League title in 2017.

History
East Grinstead Cricket Club was founded in 1857.  In 1989 the East Grinstead Cricket Club merged with nearby East Grinstead Hockey Club to create East Grinstead Sports Club Limited.  Following the merger the club sold the cricket ground and moved to the site of the hockey club, which owned its own land.  Money from the sale was spent on a new pavilion, a new cricket square and an artificial sand pitch (used for hockey).  In 2017 the club won the Sussex Cricket League for the first time and reached the semi-finals of the National Club Championship, having beaten Bath in the quarter-finals.

Honours
1st XI
 Sussex Cricket League Premier Division 
 Champions 2017

References

Cricket in West Sussex
English club cricket teams
East Grinstead
1857 establishments in England